The  is a dam complex in Hokkaidō, Japan on the Uryu River. It consists of two dams. It is a power generation dam managed by Hokkaido Electric Power Co., Inc., and is a gravity-type concrete dam with a bank height of 45.5 meters. Lake Shumarinai, which is an artificial lake, is more famous than a dam, but this lake is the largest artificial lake in Japan with a flooded area (the area of a dam lake). This record has not yet been broken since it was completed in 1943 (Showa 18) during the war.

Uryu No.1 Dam 
Uryu No.1 (Re)  is a gravity dam located in Hokkaido Prefecture in Japan. The dam is used for flood control and power production. The catchment area of the dam is 368.5 km2. The dam impounds about 2373  ha of land when full and can store 244700 thousand cubic meters of water. The construction of the dam was started on 2018 .

Uryu No.2 Dam 
Uryu No.2 Dam  is a gravity dam located in Hokkaido Prefecture in Japan. The dam is used for power production. The catchment area of the dam is 109.7 km2. The dam impounds about 177  ha of land when full and can store 21589 thousand cubic meters of water. The construction of the dam was started on 1939 and completed in 1943.

References

Dams in Hokkaido
Dams completed in 1943